Valery Veniaminovich Gayevsky  is a Russian politician who was the governor of Stavropol Krai in 2008-2012.

Gayevsky was born in 1958 in Petrykaw, modern Belarus. Since 1996, he worked in the government of Stavropol Krai. He held the positions of deputy chairman of the regional government, minister of finance, minister of economic development and trade.

Since 2006 - Deputy Plenipotentiary Representative of the President in the Southern Federal District. From May 2008 to May 2012 - Governor of Stavropol Krai. On 2 May 2012, Russian president Dmitry Medvedev accepted Gayevsky's resignation. Experts named his conflict with Plenipotentiary Alexander Khloponin as main purpose.

On 13 July 2012 he was appointed deputy minister of regional development of Russia. In 2014, he was in charge of dissolving of the ministry. In 2015 Gayevsky was appointed Deputy Minister of Agriculture.

From October 2016 to September 2021 - Senator of the Russian Federation - representative of the legislative branch of Stavropol Krai. Gayevsky's term was not prolonged by new convocation of the Duma of Stavropol Krai.

References 

 Официальный информационный интернет-портал органов государственной власти Ставропольского края

1958 births
Living people
People from Pietrykaw District
Governors of Stavropol Krai
United Russia politicians
21st-century Russian politicians
Members of the Federation Council of Russia (after 2000)